Prince of Wales Collegiate is a public high school located in St. John's, Newfoundland and Labrador, Canada. It served part of St. John's as well as the rural community of Portugal Cove-St. Philip's.

The school was erected in 1959. At that time it was called United Collegiate and along with Prince of Wales College on LeMarchant Road was governed by The United Church School Board. In 1962, Prince of Wales College closed as a high school and this school was renamed Prince of Wales Collegiate. A major extension to the original building was erected in 1993.

Prince of Wales offers a number of Advanced Placement courses and concurrent studies affiliated with Memorial University. They offer local courses in French Immersion, Spanish, Russian and Italian that come with the opportunity for international travel, and strong programs in arts, theatre and music. A wide variety of extracurricular activities are available, including a wide variety of boy's and girl's athletic teams and special interest clubs.

History
Wesleyan-Methodist Academy opened in 1860 on Longs Hill. It was a wooden building.

In 1874 the name Wesleyan-Academy changed to Methodist Academy when the Newfoundland Conference of the Methodist Church of Canada was formed. It was administered by a Board of Directors.

1886 a major expansion and reconstruction program to the building, adding a Model school (teacher training) and a students’ residence (the College Home). The Academy was now reconstituted as the Methodist College, and the Board of Directors was replaced by a Board of Governors. The College was formally known as “The Newfoundland Methodist College”.

The entire complex was destroyed in the Great Fire of July 1892.

In 1894 a new, much larger building was erected on the site, as well as a new College Home.

Edward, Prince of Wales (later King Edward VIII) was visiting Newfoundland in 1919 and laid the corner stone for the proposed new Methodist College—later named Prince of Wales College.

In January 1925, just six months before it would have become the United Church College (in keeping with Church Union in June of that year), the building, like its predecessor, fell victim to fire. The main structure of the building was salvaged.

1926 a new building was built from the old and named Holloway School, in honor of Robert Holloway, former principal of the Methodist College.

In 1928 Prince of Wales College on LeMarchant Road opened as a secondary school and Holloway School became an elementary school.

Harrington School opened in 1956, due to increased enrollment, and accommodated kindergarten and grade one.

Circa 1957, again due to a lack of space, Prince of Wales Annex on LeMarchant Road opened for Grade six.

In 1960, the present building on Paton Street opened as The United Church Regional High School, United Collegiate. The students came from Macpherson and Curtis Academy in that first year. The school was renamed Prince of Wales Collegiate in 1963.

Attacks on Prince of Wales Collegiate
March 9th 2023 Attack

External links
 NLESD school directory
   Prince of Wales Collegiate website

High schools in St. John's, Newfoundland and Labrador
High schools in Newfoundland and Labrador
Educational institutions in Canada with year of establishment missing